Kerovbe Patkanian (Քերովբե Պատկանյան; 1833–1889) was an Armenian linguist, the Professor of Armenian Studies at the St. Petersburg University. He was the brother of Raphael Patkanian. In 1863 he obtained the master's degree for his eastern literature study ("The History of Sassanid Dynasty according to Armenian Sources"); in 1864 he obtained the doctor degree in literature for "The Study of the Composition in the Armenian language".

Publications 
Catalogique de la littérature arménienne depuis le commencement du V jusqu'a XVI siécle. (St.Petersburg, 1859); 
 The first Russian translation of Movses Kagankatvatsi, the Armenian writer of the 10th century,- "The History of Aluank",- with scientific notes and research (St. Petersburg, 1861)
 "Several Words About the Adverbs of Transcaucasian Gipsies" (1886) 
 For the "Brockhaus and Efron Encyclopedic Dictionary" (1861–1863) he penned a number of articles on geography and history.

Literature 
 N. O. Emin, "Professor Patkanov as Orientalist" (Saint Petersburg, 1874); Obituary in "The Historical Herald" (1889, No. 6).

References

External links
Исследование о диалектах армянского языка. 1869, St. Petersburg

1833 births
1889 deaths
Linguists from Armenia
Academic staff of Saint Petersburg State University